NLWC may refer to:

 National League Wild Card Game, an annual playoff game in Major League Baseball
 Nittany Lion Wrestling Club, an amateur wrestling training center
 Navy League Wrennette Corp, a girls Navy cadet corps in Canada, active 1950–1997